The following is a list of Intel Xeon microprocessors, by generation.

P6-based 

 Pentium II Xeon 400
 Pentium II Xeon 400
 Pentium II Xeon 450
 Pentium II Xeon 450
 Pentium II Xeon 450
 Pentium III Xeon 500
 Pentium III Xeon 500
 Pentium III Xeon 500
 Pentium III Xeon 550
 Pentium III Xeon 550
 Pentium III Xeon 550
 Pentium III Xeon 600
 Pentium III Xeon 667
 Pentium III Xeon 700
 Pentium III Xeon 700
 Pentium III Xeon 733
 Pentium III Xeon 800
 Pentium III Xeon 866
 Pentium III Xeon 900
 Pentium III Xeon 933
 Pentium III Xeon 1.00

NetBurst-based 

 Xeon 1.4
 Xeon 1.5
 Xeon 1.7
 Xeon 2.0
 Xeon 1.8
 Xeon 2.0A
 Xeon 2.0B
 Xeon 2.2
 Xeon 2.4
 Xeon 2.4B
 Xeon 2.6
 Xeon 2.66
 Xeon 2.8
 Xeon 2.8B
 Xeon 3.0
 Xeon 3.06
 Xeon LV 1.6
 Xeon LV 2.0
 Xeon LV 2.4
 Xeon 2.4B
 Xeon 2.8B
 Xeon 3.06
 Xeon 3.2
 Xeon 3.2
 Xeon 2.8
 Xeon 2.8D
 Xeon 3.0
 Xeon 3.0D
 Xeon 3.2
 Xeon 3.4
 Xeon 3.6
 Xeon LV 2.8
 Xeon 2.8
 Xeon 2.8E
 Xeon 3.0
 Xeon 3.0E
 Xeon 3.2
 Xeon 3.2E
 Xeon 3.4
 Xeon 3.4E
 Xeon 3.6
 Xeon 3.6E
 Xeon 3.8
 Xeon 3.8E
 Xeon MV 3.2
 Xeon LV 3.0
 Xeon 2.8
 Xeon 5020
 Xeon 5030
 Xeon 5040
 Xeon 5050
 Xeon 5060
 Xeon 5070
 Xeon 5080
 Xeon MV 5063
 Xeon MP 1.4
 Xeon MP 1.5
 Xeon MP 1.6
 Xeon MP 1.5
 Xeon MP 1.9
 Xeon MP 2.0
 Xeon MP 2.0
 Xeon MP 2.2
 Xeon MP 2.5
 Xeon MP 2.7
 Xeon MP 2.8
 Xeon MP 3.0
 Xeon MP 3.16
 Xeon MP 3.66
 Xeon MP 2.83
 Xeon MP 3.0
 Xeon MP 3.33
 Xeon 7020
 Xeon 7030
 Xeon 7040
 Xeon 7041
 Xeon 7110N
 Xeon 7110M
 Xeon 7120N
 Xeon 7120M
 Xeon 7130N
 Xeon 7130M
 Xeon 7140N
 Xeon 7140M
 Xeon 7150N

Pentium M (Yonah)-based 

 Xeon LV 1.66
 Xeon LV 2.0
 Xeon LV 2.16
 Xeon ULV 1.66

Core-based 

 Xeon 3040
 Xeon 3050
 Xeon 3040
 Xeon 3050
 Xeon 3060
 Xeon 3065
 Xeon 3070
 Xeon 3075
 Xeon 3085
 Xeon 5110
 Xeon 5120
 Xeon 5130
 Xeon 5140
 Xeon 5150
 Xeon 5160
 Xeon LV 5113
 Xeon LV 5128
 Xeon LV 5133
 Xeon LV 5138
 Xeon LV 5148
 Xeon L3014
 Xeon E3113
 Xeon E3110
 Xeon E3120
 Xeon L3110
 Xeon E5205
 Xeon E5220
 Xeon E5240
 Xeon X5260
 Xeon X5270
 Xeon X5272
 Xeon L5215
 Xeon L5238
 Xeon L5240
 Xeon L5248
 Xeon X3210
 Xeon X3220
 Xeon X3230
 Xeon X3320
 Xeon X3330
 Xeon X3350
 Xeon X3360
 Xeon X3370
 Xeon X3380
 Xeon L3360
 Xeon X3323
 Xeon X3353
 Xeon X3363
 Xeon E5310
 Xeon E5320
 Xeon E5330
 Xeon E5335
 Xeon E5340
 Xeon E5345
 Xeon E5350, X5350
 Xeon X5355
 Xeon X5365
 Xeon L5310
 Xeon L5318
 Xeon L5320
 Xeon L5335
 Xeon E5405
 Xeon E5410
 Xeon E5420
 Xeon E5430
 Xeon E5440
 Xeon E5450
 Xeon X5450
 Xeon X5460
 Xeon E5462
 Xeon X5470
 Xeon E5472
 Xeon X5472
 Xeon X5482
 Xeon X5492
 Xeon L5408
 Xeon L5410
 Xeon L5420
 Xeon L5430
 Xeon E7210
 Xeon E7220
 Xeon E7310
 Xeon E7320
 Xeon E7330
 Xeon E7340
 Xeon X7350
 Xeon L7345
 Xeon E7420
 Xeon E7430
 Xeon E7440
 Xeon L7445
 Xeon E7450
 Xeon E7458
 Xeon X7460
 Xeon L7455

Nehalem-based 

 Xeon X3430
 Xeon X3440
 Xeon X3450
 Xeon X3460
 Xeon X3470
 Xeon X3480
 Xeon L3426
 Xeon W3503
 Xeon W3505
 Xeon W3520
 Xeon W3530
 Xeon W3540
 Xeon W3550
 Xeon W3565
 Xeon W3570
 Xeon W3580
 Xeon LC3518
 Xeon LC3528
 Xeon EC3539
 Xeon L3403
 Xeon L3406
 Xeon W3670
 Xeon W3680
 Xeon W3690
 Xeon E5502
 Xeon E5503
 Xeon L5508
 Xeon E5504
 Xeon E5506
 Xeon E5507
 Xeon E5520
 Xeon E5530
 Xeon E5540
 Xeon X5550
 Xeon X5560
 Xeon X5570
 Xeon W5580
 Xeon W5590
 Xeon L5506
 Xeon L5518
 Xeon L5520
 Xeon L5530
 Xeon EC5539
 Xeon EC5509
 Xeon EC5549
 Xeon LC5518
 Xeon LC5528
 Xeon X5698
 Xeon E5603
 Xeon E5606
 Xeon E5607
 Xeon E5620
 Xeon E5630
 Xeon E5640
 Xeon X5647
 Xeon X5667
 Xeon X5672
 Xeon X5677
 Xeon X5687
 Xeon L5609
 Xeon L5618
 Xeon L5630
 Xeon E5645
 Xeon E5649
 Xeon X5650
 Xeon X5660
 Xeon X5670
 Xeon X5675
 Xeon X5679
 Xeon X5680
 Xeon X5690
 Xeon L5638
 Xeon L5639
 Xeon L5640
 Xeon L5645
 Xeon E6510
 Xeon E7520
 Xeon E7530
 Xeon E6540
 Xeon E7540
 Xeon X7542
 Xeon L7545
 Xeon X6550
 Xeon X7550
 Xeon X7560
 Xeon L7555
 Xeon E7-2803
 Xeon E7-4807
 Xeon E7-2820
 Xeon E7-2830
 Xeon E7-4820
 Xeon E7-4830
 Xeon E7-8830
 Xeon E7-8837
 Xeon E7-2850
 Xeon E7-2860
 Xeon E7-2870
 Xeon E7-4850
 Xeon E7-4860
 Xeon E7-4870
 Xeon E7-8850
 Xeon E7-8860
 Xeon E7-8870
 Xeon E7-8867L

Sandy Bridge-based 

 Xeon E3-1105C
 Xeon E3-1125C
 Xeon E3-1220
 Xeon E3-1220L
 Xeon E3-1225
 Xeon E3-1230
 Xeon E3-1235
 Xeon E3-1240
 Xeon E3-1245
 Xeon E3-1260L
 Xeon E3-1265L
 Xeon E3-1270
 Xeon E3-1275
 Xeon E3-1280
 Xeon E3-1290
 Xeon E5-1410
 Xeon E5-1428L
 Xeon E5-2403
 Xeon E5-2407
 Xeon E5-2418L
 Xeon E5-2420
 Xeon E5-2428L
 Xeon E5-2430
 Xeon E5-2430L
 Xeon E5-2440
 Xeon E5-2448L
 Xeon E5-2449L
 Xeon E5-2450
 Xeon E5-2450L
 Xeon E5-2470
 Xeon E5-1603
 Xeon E5-1607
 Xeon E5-1620
 Xeon E5-1650
 Xeon E5-1660
 Xeon E5-2637
 Xeon E5-2603
 Xeon E5-2609
 Xeon E5-2618L
 Xeon E5-2620
 Xeon E5-2628L
 Xeon E5-2630
 Xeon E5-2630L
 Xeon E5-2640
 Xeon E5-2643
 Xeon E5-2648L
 Xeon E5-2650
 Xeon E5-2650L
 Xeon E5-2658
 Xeon E5-2660
 Xeon E5-2665
 Xeon E5-2667
 Xeon E5-2670
 Xeon E5-2680
 Xeon E5-2687W
 Xeon E5-2689
 Xeon E5-2690
 Xeon E5-4603
 Xeon E5-4607
 Xeon E5-4610
 Xeon E5-4617
 Xeon E5-4620
 Xeon E5-4640
 Xeon E5-4650
 Xeon E5-4650L

Ivy Bridge-based 

 Xeon E3-1105C v2
 Xeon E3-1125C v2
 Xeon E3-1135C v2
 Xeon E3-1220L v2
 Xeon E3-1220 v2
 Xeon E3-1225 v2
 Xeon E3-1230 v2
 Xeon E3-1240 v2
 Xeon E3-1245 v2
 Xeon E3-1270 v2
 Xeon E3-1275 v2
 Xeon E3-1280 v2
 Xeon E3-1285 v2
 Xeon E3-1290 v2
 Xeon E3-1265L v2
 Xeon E3-1285L v2
 Xeon E5-1410 v2
 Xeon E5-1428L v2
 Xeon E5-2403 v2
 Xeon E5-2407 v2
 Xeon E5-2420 v2
 Xeon E5-2430 v2
 Xeon E5-2418L v2
 Xeon E5-2430L v2
 Xeon E5-2440 v2
 Xeon E5-2450 v2
 Xeon E5-2428L v2
 Xeon E5-2470 v2
 Xeon E5-2448L v2
 Xeon E5-2450L v2
 Xeon E5-1607 v2
 Xeon E5-1620 v2
 Xeon E5-1650 v2
 Xeon E5-1660 v2
 Xeon E5-1680 v2
 Xeon E5-2603 v2
 Xeon E5-2609 v2
 Xeon E5-2637 v2
 Xeon E5-2620 v2
 Xeon E5-2630 v2
 Xeon E5-2643 v2
 Xeon E5-2618L v2
 Xeon E5-2630L v2
 Xeon E5-2640 v2
 Xeon E5-2650 v2
 Xeon E5-2667 v2
 Xeon E5-2673 v2
 Xeon E5-2687W v2
 Xeon E5-2628L v2
 Xeon E5-2658 v2
 Xeon E5-2660 v2
 Xeon E5-2670 v2
 Xeon E5-2680 v2
 Xeon E5-2690 v2
 Xeon E5-2648L v2
 Xeon E5-2650L v2
 Xeon E5-2651 v2
 Xeon E5-2692 v2
 Xeon E5-2695 v2
 Xeon E5-2696 v2
 Xeon E5-2697 v2
 Xeon E5-4603 v2
 Xeon E5-4607 v2
 Xeon E5-4610 v2
 Xeon E5-4620 v2
 Xeon E5-4627 v2
 Xeon E5-4624L v2
 Xeon E5-4640 v2
 Xeon E5-4650 v2
 Xeon E5-4657L v2
 Xeon E7-2850 v2
 Xeon E7-2870 v2
 Xeon E7-2880 v2
 Xeon E7-2890 v2
 Xeon E7-4809 v2
 Xeon E7-4820 v2
 Xeon E7-4830 v2
 Xeon E7-4850 v2
 Xeon E7-4860 v2
 Xeon E7-4870 v2
 Xeon E7-4880 v2
 Xeon E7-4890 v2
 Xeon E7-8893 v2
 Xeon E7-8891 v2
 Xeon E7-8850 v2
 Xeon E7-8857 v2
 Xeon E7-8870 v2
 Xeon E7-8880 v2
 Xeon E7-8880L v2
 Xeon E7-8890 v2
 Xeon E7-8895 v2

Haswell-based 

 Xeon E3-1220L v3
 Xeon E3-1220 v3
 Xeon E3-1225 v3
 Xeon E3-1226 v3
 Xeon E3-1230 v3
 Xeon E3-1231 v3
 Xeon E3-1240 v3
 Xeon E3-1241 v3
 Xeon E3-1245 v3
 Xeon E3-1246 v3
 Xeon E3-1270 v3
 Xeon E3-1271 v3
 Xeon E3-1275 v3
 Xeon E3-1276 v3
 Xeon E3-1280 v3
 Xeon E3-1281 v3
 Xeon E3-1285 v3
 Xeon E3-1286 v3
 Xeon E3-1265L v3
 Xeon E3-1268L v3
 Xeon E3-1275L v3
 Xeon E3-1284L v3
 Xeon E3-1285L v3
 Xeon E3-1286L v3
 Xeon E3-1230L v3
 Xeon E3-1240L v3
 Xeon E5-1428L v3
 Xeon E5-2408L v3
 Xeon E5-2418L v3
 Xeon E5-2428L v3
 Xeon E5-2438L v3
 Xeon E5-1603 v3
 Xeon E5-1607 v3
 Xeon E5-1620 v3
 Xeon E5-1630 v3
 Xeon E5-1650 v3
 Xeon E5-1660 v3
 Xeon E5-1680 v3
 Xeon E5-1681 v3
 Xeon E5-1686 v3
 Xeon E5-1691 v3
 Xeon E5-2623 v3
 Xeon E5-2637 v3
 Xeon E5-2603 v3
 Xeon E5-2608L v3
 Xeon E5-2609 v3
 Xeon E5-2620 v3
 Xeon E5-2643 v3
 Xeon E5-2618L v3
 Xeon E5-2622 v3
 Xeon E5-2628 v3
 Xeon E5-2629 v3
 Xeon E5-2630 v3
 Xeon E5-2630L v3
 Xeon E5-2640 v3
 Xeon E5-2667 v3
 Xeon E5-2628L v3
 Xeon E5-2649 v3
 Xeon E5-2650 v3
 Xeon E5-2652 v3
 Xeon E5-2660 v3
 Xeon E5-2663 v3
 Xeon E5-2666 v3
 Xeon E5-2687W v3
 Xeon E5-2648L v3
 Xeon E5-2650L v3
 Xeon E5-2658 v3
 Xeon E5-2658A v3
 Xeon E5-2669 v3
 Xeon E5-2670 v3
 Xeon E5-2673 v3
 Xeon E5-2676 v3
 Xeon E5-2678 v3
 Xeon E5-2680 v3
 Xeon E5-2685 v3
 Xeon E5-2690 v3
 Xeon E5-2692 v3
 Xeon E5-2693 v3 (ES)
 Xeon E5-2683 v3
 Xeon E5-2695 v3
 Xeon E5-2697 v3
 Xeon E5-2675 v3
 Xeon E5-2698 v3
 Xeon E5-2698A v3
 Xeon E5-2698B v3
 Xeon E5-2686 v3
 Xeon E5-2696 v3
 Xeon E5-2699 v3
 Xeon E5-4655 v3
 Xeon E5-4610 v3
 Xeon E5-4620 v3
 Xeon E5-4627 v3
 Xeon E5-4640 v3
 Xeon E5-4648 v3
 Xeon E5-4650 v3
 Xeon E5-4660 v3
 Xeon E5-4667 v3
 Xeon E5-4669 v3
 Xeon E7-4809 v3
 Xeon E7-4820 v3
 Xeon E7-4830 v3
 Xeon E7-4850 v3
 Xeon E7-8893 v3
 Xeon E7-8891 v3
 Xeon E7-8860 v3
 Xeon E7-8867 v3
 Xeon E7-8870 v3
 Xeon E7-8880 v3
 Xeon E7-8880L v3
 Xeon E7-8890 v3
 Xeon E7-8895 v3

Broadwell-based 

 Xeon D-1513N
 Xeon D-1518
 Xeon D-1520
 Xeon D-1521
 Xeon D-1523N
 Xeon D-1527
 Xeon D-1529
 Xeon D-1528
 Xeon D-1531
 Xeon D-1533N
 Xeon D-1537
 Xeon D-1539
 Xeon D-1540
 Xeon D-1541
 Xeon D-1543N
 Xeon D-1548
 Xeon D-1553N
 Xeon D-1557
 Xeon D-1559
 Xeon D-1567
 Xeon D-1571
 Xeon D-1577
 Xeon D-1581
 Xeon D-1587
 Xeon D-1602
 Xeon D-1622
 Xeon D-1627
 Xeon D-1637
 Xeon D-1623N
 Xeon D-1633N
 Xeon D-1649N
 Xeon D-1653N
 Xeon E3-1285 v4
 Xeon E3-1258L v4
 Xeon E3-1265L v4
 Xeon E3-1270L v4
 Xeon E3-1278L v4
 Xeon E3-1283L v4
 Xeon E3-1284L v4
 Xeon E3-1285L v4
 Xeon E5-1603 v4
 Xeon E5-1607 v4
 Xeon E5-1620 v4
 Xeon E5-1630 v4
 Xeon E5-1650 v4
 Xeon E5-1660 v4
 Xeon E5-1680 v4
 Xeon E5-2623 v4
 Xeon E5-2637 v4
 Xeon E5-2603 v4
 Xeon E5-2643 v4
 Xeon E5-2608L v4
 Xeon E5-2609 v4
 Xeon E5-2620 v4
 Xeon E5-2667 v4
 Xeon E5-2689A v4
 Xeon E5-2618L v4
 Xeon E5-2630 v4
 Xeon E5-2630L v4
 Xeon E5-2640 v4
 Xeon E5-2689 v4
 Xeon E5-2628L v4
 Xeon E5-2650 v4
 Xeon E5-2666 v4
 Xeon E5-2687W v4
 Xeon E5-2648L v4
 Xeon E5-2650L v4
 Xeon E5-2658 v4
 Xeon E5-2660 v4
 Xeon E5-2680 v4
 Xeon E5-2690 v4
 Xeon AWS-1100 v4
 Xeon E5-2676 v4
 Xeon E5-2682 v4
 Xeon E5-2683 v4
 Xeon E5-2697A v4
 Xeon E5-2686 v4
 Xeon E5-2695 v4
 Xeon E5-2697 v4
 Xeon E5-2673 v4
 Xeon E5-2679 v4
 Xeon E5-2698 v4
 Xeon E5-2696 v4
 Xeon E5-2699 v4
 Xeon E5-2699A v4
 Xeon E5-2699C v4
 Xeon E5-2699R v4
 Xeon E5-2699P v4
 Xeon E5-4610 v4
 Xeon E5-4620 v4
 Xeon E5-4627 v4
 Xeon E5-4628L v4
 Xeon E5-4640 v4
 Xeon E5-4650 v4
 Xeon E5-4655 v4
 Xeon E5-4660 v4
 Xeon E5-4667 v4
 Xeon E5-4669 v4
 Xeon E7-4809 v4
 Xeon E7-4820 v4
 Xeon E7-4830 v4
 Xeon E7-4850 v4
 Xeon E7-8855 v4
 Xeon E7-8860 v4
 Xeon E7-8867 v4
 Xeon E7-8870 v4
 Xeon E7-8880 v4
 Xeon E7-8890 v4
 Xeon E7-8891 v4
 Xeon E7-8893 v4
 Xeon E7-8894 v4

Skylake-based 

 Xeon D-2141I
 Xeon D-2161I
 Xeon D-2191
 Xeon D-2123IT
 Xeon D-2142IT
 Xeon D-2143IT
 Xeon D-2163IT
 Xeon D-2173IT
 Xeon D-2183IT
 Xeon D-2145NT
 Xeon D-2146NT
 Xeon D-2166NT
 Xeon D-2177NT
 Xeon D-2187NT
 Xeon E3-1220 v5
 Xeon E3-1225 v5
 Xeon E3-1230 v5
 Xeon E3-1240 v5
 Xeon E3-1245 v5
 Xeon E3-1270 v5
 Xeon E3-1275 v5
 Xeon E3-1280 v5
 Xeon E3-1260L v5
 Xeon E3-1268L v5
 Xeon E3-1235L v5
 Xeon E3-1240L v5
 Xeon E3-1585 v5
 Xeon E3-1505M v5
 Xeon E3-1515M v5
 Xeon E3-1535M v5
 Xeon E3-1545M v5
 Xeon E3-1575M v5
 Xeon E3-1565L v5
 Xeon E3-1585L v5
 Xeon E3-1505L v5
 Xeon E3-1558L v5
 Xeon E3-1578L v5
 Xeon W-2102
 Xeon W-2104
 Xeon W-2123
 Xeon W-2125
 Xeon W-2133
 Xeon W-2135
 Xeon W-2140B
 Xeon W-2145
 Xeon W-2150B
 Xeon W-2155
 Xeon W-2175
 Xeon W-2190B
 Xeon W-2195
 Xeon W-3175X
 Xeon Bronze 3104
 Xeon Bronze 3106
 Xeon Silver 4106H
 Xeon Silver 4108
 Xeon Silver 4109T
 Xeon Silver 4110
 Xeon Silver 4112
 Xeon Silver 4114
 Xeon Silver 4114T
 Xeon Silver 4116
 Xeon Silver 4116T
 Xeon Silver 4123
 Xeon Gold 5115
 Xeon Gold 5117
 Xeon Gold 5117F
 Xeon Gold 5118
 Xeon Gold 5119T
 Xeon Gold 5120
 Xeon Gold 5120T
 Xeon Gold 5122
 Xeon Gold 6122
 Xeon Gold 6126
 Xeon Gold 6126F
 Xeon Gold 6126T
 Xeon Gold 6127M
 Xeon Gold 6128
 Xeon Gold 6130
 Xeon Gold 6130F
 Xeon Gold 6130T
 Xeon Gold 6132
 Xeon Gold 6133
 Xeon Gold 6134
 Xeon Gold 6134M
 Xeon Gold 6135
 Xeon Gold 6135M
 Xeon Gold 6136
 Xeon Gold 6137
 Xeon Gold 6137M
 Xeon Gold 6138
 Xeon Gold 6138F
 Xeon Gold 6138P
 Xeon Gold 6138T
 Xeon Gold 6139
 Xeon Gold 6139M
 Xeon Gold 6140
 Xeon Gold 6140M
 Xeon Gold 6142
 Xeon Gold 6142F
 Xeon Gold 6142M
 Xeon Gold 6143
 Xeon Gold 6144
 Xeon Gold 6145
 Xeon Gold 6146
 Xeon Gold 6148
 Xeon Gold 6148F
 Xeon Gold 6149
 Xeon Gold 6150
 Xeon Gold 6151
 Xeon Gold 6152
 Xeon Gold 6154
 Xeon Gold 6155
 Xeon Gold 6159
 Xeon Gold 6161
 Xeon Platinum P-8124
 Xeon Platinum 8124M
 Xeon Platinum P-8136
 Xeon Platinum 8153
 Xeon Platinum 8156
 Xeon Platinum 8158
 Xeon Platinum 8160
 Xeon Platinum 8160F
 Xeon Platinum 8160H
 Xeon Platinum 8160M
 Xeon Platinum 8160T
 Xeon Platinum 8163
 Xeon Platinum 8164
 Xeon Platinum 8165
 Xeon Platinum 8167M
 Xeon Platinum 8168
 Xeon Platinum 8170
 Xeon Platinum 8170M
 Xeon Platinum 8171M
 Xeon Platinum 8172M
 Xeon Platinum 8173M
 Xeon Platinum 8174
 Xeon Platinum 8175M
 Xeon Platinum 8176
 Xeon Platinum 8176F
 Xeon Platinum 8176M
 Xeon Platinum 8179M
 Xeon Platinum 8180
 Xeon Platinum 8180M

Kaby Lake-based 

 Xeon E3-1205 v6
 Xeon E3-1220 v6
 Xeon E3-1225 v6
 Xeon E3-1230 v6
 Xeon E3-1240 v6
 Xeon E3-1245 v6
 Xeon E3-1270 v6
 Xeon E3-1275 v6
 Xeon E3-1280 v6
 Xeon E3-1285 v6
 Xeon E3-1505M v6
 Xeon E3-1535M v6
 Xeon E3-1501M v6
 Xeon E3-1501L v6
 Xeon E3-1505L v6

Coffee Lake-based 

 Xeon E-2104G
 Xeon E-2124
 Xeon E-2124G
 Xeon E-2126G
 Xeon E-2134
 Xeon E-2136
 Xeon E-2144G
 Xeon E-2146G
 Xeon E-2174G
 Xeon E-2176G
 Xeon E-2186G
 Xeon E-2224
 Xeon E-2224G
 Xeon E-2226G
 Xeon E-2234
 Xeon E-2236
 Xeon E-2244G
 Xeon E-2246G
 Xeon E-2274G
 Xeon E-2276G
 Xeon E-2278G
 Xeon E-2286G
 Xeon E-2288G
 Xeon E-2226GE
 Xeon E-2278GE
 Xeon E-2278GEL
 Xeon E-2176M
 Xeon E-2186M
 Xeon E-2276M
 Xeon E-2286M
 Xeon E-2254ME
 Xeon E-2276ME
 Xeon E-2254ML
 Xeon E-2276ML

Cascade Lake-based 

 Xeon Bronze 3204
 Xeon Bronze 3206R
 Xeon Silver 4208
 Xeon Silver 4209T
 Xeon Silver 4210
 Xeon Silver 4210R
 Xeon Silver 4210T
 Xeon Silver 4214
 Xeon Silver 4214R
 Xeon Silver 4214Y
 Xeon Silver 4215
 Xeon Silver 4215R
 Xeon Silver 4216
 Xeon Gold 5215
 Xeon Gold 5215L
 Xeon Gold 5215M
 Xeon Gold 5217
 Xeon Gold 5218
 Xeon Gold 5218B
 Xeon Gold 5218N
 Xeon Gold 5218T
 Xeon Gold 5219Y
 Xeon Gold 5220
 Xeon Gold 5220R
 Xeon Gold 5220S
 Xeon Gold 5220T
 Xeon Gold 5222
 Xeon Gold 6208U
 Xeon Gold 6209U
 Xeon Gold 6210U
 Xeon Gold 6212U
 Xeon Gold 6222V
 Xeon Gold 6222
 Xeon Gold 6226
 Xeon Gold 6226R
 Xeon Gold 6230
 Xeon Gold 6230N
 Xeon Gold 6230R
 Xeon Gold 6230T
 Xeon Gold 6233
 Xeon Gold 6234
 Xeon Gold 6238
 Xeon Gold 6238L
 Xeon Gold 6238M
 Xeon Gold 6238R
 Xeon Gold 6238T
 Xeon Gold 6240
 Xeon Gold 6240L
 Xeon Gold 6240M
 Xeon Gold 6240R
 Xeon Gold 6240Y
 Xeon Gold 6242
 Xeon Gold 6242R
 Xeon Gold 6244
 Xeon Gold 6246
 Xeon Gold 6246R
 Xeon Gold 6248
 Xeon Gold 6248R
 Xeon Gold 6250
 Xeon Gold 6252
 Xeon Gold 6252N
 Xeon Gold 6254
 Xeon Gold 6258R
 Xeon Gold 6262
 Xeon Gold 6262V
 Xeon Gold 6269Y
 Xeon Gold 6268CL
 Xeon Gold 6278C
 Xeon Platinum 8253
 Xeon Platinum 8256
 Xeon Platinum 8259L
 Xeon Platinum 8259CL
 Xeon Platinum 8260
 Xeon Platinum 8260L
 Xeon Platinum 8260M
 Xeon Platinum 8260Y
 Xeon Platinum 8268
 Xeon Platinum 8270
 Xeon Platinum 8274
 Xeon Platinum 8275CL
 Xeon Platinum 8276
 Xeon Platinum 8276L
 Xeon Platinum 8276M
 Xeon Platinum 8280
 Xeon Platinum 8280L
 Xeon Platinum 8280M
 Xeon Platinum 8284
 Xeon Platinum 9221
 Xeon Platinum 9222
 Xeon Platinum 9242
 Xeon Platinum 9282
 Xeon W-2223
 Xeon W-2225
 Xeon W-2235
 Xeon W-2245
 Xeon W-2255
 Xeon W-2265
 Xeon W-2275
 Xeon W-2295
 Xeon W-3223
 Xeon W-3225
 Xeon W-3235
 Xeon W-3245
 Xeon W-3245M
 Xeon W-3265
 Xeon W-3265M
 Xeon W-3275
 Xeon W-3275M

Comet Lake-based 

 Xeon W-1250
 Xeon W-1250E
 Xeon W-1250P
 Xeon W-1250TE
 Xeon W-1270
 Xeon W-1270E
 Xeon W-1270P
 Xeon W-1270TE
 Xeon W-1290
 Xeon W-1290E
 Xeon W-1290P
 Xeon W-1290T
 Xeon W-1290TE
 Xeon W-10855M
 Xeon W-10885M

Cooper Lake-based 

 Xeon Gold 5318H
 Xeon Gold 5320H
 Xeon Gold 6328H
 Xeon Gold 6328HL
 Xeon Gold 6330H
 Xeon Gold 6348H
 Xeon Platinum 8353H
 Xeon Platinum 8354H
 Xeon Platinum 8356H
 Xeon Platinum 8360H
 Xeon Platinum 8360HL
 Xeon Platinum 8376H
 Xeon Platinum 8376HL
 Xeon Platinum 8380H
 Xeon Platinum 8380HL

Ice Lake-based 

 Xeon Silver 4309Y
 Xeon Silver 4310
 Xeon Silver 4310T
 Xeon Silver 4314
 Xeon Silver 4316
 Xeon Gold 5315Y
 Xeon Gold 5317
 Xeon Gold 5318N
 Xeon Gold 5318S
 Xeon Gold 5318Y
 Xeon Gold 5320
 Xeon Gold 5320T
 Xeon Gold 6326
 Xeon Gold 6330
 Xeon Gold 6330N
 Xeon Gold 6334
 Xeon Gold 6336Y
 Xeon Gold 6338
 Xeon Gold 6338N
 Xeon Gold 6338T
 Xeon Gold 6342
 Xeon Gold 6346
 Xeon Gold 6348
 Xeon Gold 6354
 Xeon Platinum 8351N
 Xeon Platinum 8352M
 Xeon Platinum 8352S
 Xeon Platinum 8352V
 Xeon Platinum 8352Y
 Xeon Platinum 8358
 Xeon Platinum 8358P
 Xeon Platinum 8360Y
 Xeon Platinum 8362
 Xeon Platinum 8368
 Xeon Platinum 8368Q
 Xeon Platinum 8380
 Xeon W-3323
 Xeon W-3335
 Xeon W-3345
 Xeon W-3365
 Xeon W-3375

Rocket Lake-based 

 Xeon E-2314
 Xeon E-2324G
 Xeon E-2334
 Xeon E-2336
 Xeon E-2356G
 Xeon E-2374G
 Xeon E-2378
 Xeon E-2378G
 Xeon E-2386G
 Xeon E-2388G
 Xeon W-1350
 Xeon W-1350P
 Xeon W-1370
 Xeon W-1370P
 Xeon W-1390
 Xeon W-1390P
 Xeon W-1390T

Tiger Lake-based 

 Xeon W-11155ML
 Xeon W-11155MRE
 Xeon W-11555MLE
 Xeon W-11555MRE
 Xeon W-11855M
 Xeon W-11865MLE
 Xeon W-11865MRE
 Xeon W-11955M

Sapphire Rapids-based 

 Xeon Bronze 3408U
 Xeon Silver 4410T
 Xeon Silver 4410Y
 Xeon Silver 4416+
 Xeon Gold 5411N
 Xeon Gold 5412U
 Xeon Gold 5415+
 Xeon Gold 5416S
 Xeon Gold 5418N
 Xeon Gold 5418Y
 Xeon Gold 5420+
 Xeon Gold 6414U
 Xeon Gold 6416H
 Xeon Gold 6418H
 Xeon Gold 6421N
 Xeon Gold 6426Y
 Xeon Gold 6428N
 Xeon Gold 6430
 Xeon Gold 6434
 Xeon Gold 6434H
 Xeon Gold 6438M
 Xeon Gold 6438N
 Xeon Gold 6438Y+
 Xeon Gold 6442Y
 Xeon Gold 6444Y
 Xeon Gold 6448H
 Xeon Gold 6448Y
 Xeon Gold 6454S
 Xeon Gold 6458Q
 Xeon Platinum 8444H
 Xeon Platinum 8450H
 Xeon Platinum 8452Y
 Xeon Platinum 8454H
 Xeon Platinum 8458P
 Xeon Platinum 8460H
 Xeon Platinum 8460Y+
 Xeon Platinum 8461V
 Xeon Platinum 8462Y+
 Xeon Platinum 8468
 Xeon Platinum 8468H
 Xeon Platinum 8468V
 Xeon Platinum 8470
 Xeon Platinum 8470N
 Xeon Platinum 8470Q
 Xeon Platinum 8471N
 Xeon Platinum 8480+
 Xeon Platinum 8490H
 Xeon Max 9460
 Xeon Max 9462
 Xeon Max 9468
 Xeon Max 9470
 Xeon Max 9480
 Xeon w3-2423
 Xeon w3-2425
 Xeon w3-2435
 Xeon w5-2445
 Xeon w5-2455X
 Xeon w5-2465X
 Xeon w7-2475X
 Xeon w7-2495X
 Xeon w5-3425
 Xeon w5-3435X
 Xeon w7-3445
 Xeon w7-3455
 Xeon w7-3465X
 Xeon w9-3475X
 Xeon w9-3495X

See also 
 List of Intel Xeon chipsets
 List of AMD Opteron processors
 AMD EPYC
 List of Intel microprocessors

External links 

 SSPEC/QDF Reference (Intel)
 Intel Processor Numbers

Intel Xeon